Bad As I Wanna Be is a 1996 book that is the first autobiography of NBA player Dennis Rodman and was written during the 1995-96 season when Rodman was a part of the Bulls team that went on to win three NBA Championships. Tim Keown was Rodman's ghostwriter. 
   
The book opens with Rodman recounting an incident during the 1992–93 basketball season. Throughout the book, in addition to talking about his life and his basketball career Rodman opines about several things.

Bad As I Wanna Be is also widely known for the various different type settings present throughout the book. While most of the book is printed in one font, there are various parts of italicized, bolded, narrowed, widened, and capitalized text throughout the book. There was never a clear reason given for this, but it was believed that Rodman was emulating a similar style that Howard Stern's "Miss America" was done in.

This book has been adapted into the movie Bad As I Wanna Be: The Dennis Rodman Story.

1996 non-fiction books
Sports autobiographies
Basketball books